Leuciscus dzungaricus is a species of cyprinid fish, known from Bulgan Gol river in Mongolia.

References 

Leuciscus
Fish described in 1998